The Future of Culture in Egypt is a 1938 book by the Egyptian writer Taha Hussein.

The book is a work of Egyptian nationalism advocating both independence and the adoption of various European modes of behaviour and institutions such as a strong military. The book was written some time after the granting of Egyptian independence by the British in 1922 but while there remained considerable British influence. Independence was furthered by the nationalisation of the Suez Canal by Egypt in 1956, a move recommended by Hussein in the book.

Hussein stressed the shared heritage of the Mediterranean civilization and Egypt's connections with European culture over its relationship with the Middle East. It opposed the Arab nationalist view of unity among all Arabic-speaking nations. The question is still debated.

He also talked of the need to improve Egyptian education.

... I see Egypt responding to my plea for ever greater efforts to banish ignorance from her midst and provide everyone—rich and poor, strong and weak, keen and dull, young and old—with his portion of knowledge. The delights of learning will permeate their soul and its light will illuminate every dwelling from castle to hovel. A new life and a new energy will infuse Egypt and will turn her into a veritable paradise on earth.

External links
Excerpt from the Internet Modern History Sourcebook

1938 non-fiction books
Egyptian culture
Egyptian nationalism
Egyptian non-fiction literature
Pharaonism
Books by Taha Hussein